Takagia is a genus of true bugs belonging to the family Aphrophoridae.

Species
The species of this genus are found in Japan.

Species:
 Takagia lugubris (Lethierry, 1876)

References

Aphrophoridae